The 2022–23 AEK B.C. season is AEK's 66th season in the top-tier level Greek Basket League. AEK is competing in three different competitions during the season. The team participated in Trofeo d’Abruzzo, a pre-season tournament, and finished second after losing the final to German side Bayern Munich of the BBL. In December 2022, a BCL single athletic judge imposed sanctions to the Greek basketball club for the incidents that occurred before the start of the second group stage game against the Italian side UnaHotels Reggio Emilia.

Transfers 2022–23

Players In 

|}

Players Out 

|}

Friendlies

Competitions

Overall

Overview

Greek League

League table

Results summary

Results by round

Regular season

Results overview

Greek Cup

 Quarterfinals

 Semifinals

FIBA Champions League

Regular season - Group B

Results summary

Results by round

Regular season

Results overview

Play-ins

Round of 16 - Group K

Results summary

Results by round

Round of 16

Results overview

References

External links
Official websites
 esake.gr 

AEK B.C. seasons
AEK B.C. season
AEK B.C. season